is a passenger railway station located in the city of Toda, Saitama, Japan, operated by the East Japan Railway Company (JR East).

Lines
Some trains continue northward to  via the Kawagoe Line and southward to  via the TWR Rinkai Line. The station is located 13.7 km north of Ikebukuro Station. The station identification colour is "orange".

Station layout
The station consists of one elevated island platform serving two tracks, with the station building located underneath. The tracks of the Tōhoku Shinkansen also run adjacent to this station, on the west side. The station is staffed.

Platforms

An arrangement of the Toda City song has been used as the departure melody for trains departing from the up platform (platform 1) since 1 August 2007.

History
Kita-Toda Station opened on 30 September 1985.

Passenger statistics
In fiscal 2019, the station was used by an average of 22,196 passengers daily (boarding passengers only).

The passenger figures for previous years are as shown below.

Surrounding area

 Aeon Mall Kita-Toda
 Toda City Library
 Toda City Local History Museum

Schools
 Saitama Prefectural Nanryo High School
 Saitama Municipal Urawa Minami High School
 Saitama Municipal Tsuji Elementary School
 Toda Municipal Ashihara Elementary School

See also
 List of railway stations in Japan

References

External links

 Kita-Toda Station information (JR East) 

Railway stations in Japan opened in 1985
Saikyō Line
Stations of East Japan Railway Company
Railway stations in Saitama Prefecture
Toda, Saitama